David Syme (born 23 June 1997) is a Scottish footballer currently playing as a centre-back for Troon on loan from Darvel.

Career
Syme made his Kilmarnock debut on 4 April 2015, in s 2–1 defeat to Motherwell, scoring the Rugby Park's club's only goal of the game.

On 16 June 2016, Syme signed a one-year-contract with Firhill side Partick Thistle. The defender left Kilmarnock after three years he broke through the youth development team and into the first team and left after 11 games and just only one goal to his name, his manager Lee Clark described him as a highly rated young defender with bags of ability and wished him well on his move to Partick Thistle.

On 21 January 2017, Syme was released by Thistle after only featuring twice for the club in cup fixtures and predominantly spending his time with the under 20s squad. On 31 January 2017 he signed for Scottish Championship side Raith Rovers until the end of the 2016–17 season. On 14 March 2017, it was announced that Syme had joined Cowdenbeath on loan. Syme was released by Rovers at the end of the season, and subsequently signed for Cowdenbeath on 9 June 2017. In Syme's first game for the club he bagged a double in a Betfred cup fixture and also went onto score in his league debut for the side.

He moved on to join West Region side Troon in March 2018 under Jimmy Kirkwood & his former Kilmarnock Coach Matt Maley, where he won promotion to the Premier Division. After a successful period, he suddenly joined Premier Division rivals Kilwinning Rangers for an undisclosed fee, where he spent four seasons at Buffs Park, much of that period as Captain. He became the subject of a record transfer between WOSFL clubs in March 2022 when he signed for Darvel for a reported £12,000.

On 23 February 2023, Syme returned to Troon on loan until the end of the 2022–23 season.

Career statistics

Honours

Kilwinning Rangers
Eglinton Cup: Winner 2021-22
West of Scotland Football League Cup: Runner-up 2021-22

Darvel
West of Scotland Football League Premier Division: Champions 2021-22

References

External links

1997 births
Living people
Scottish footballers
Kilmarnock F.C. players
Partick Thistle F.C. players
Raith Rovers F.C. players
Cowdenbeath F.C. players
Troon F.C. players
Kilwinning Rangers F.C. players
Darvel F.C. players
Scottish Professional Football League players
Association football central defenders
West of Scotland Football League players